"The Nearness of You" is a popular song, written in 1938 by Hoagy Carmichael with lyrics by Ned Washington.

The Nearness of You may also refer to:
 The Nearness of You (Shelly Berg album), 2008
 The Nearness of You (Paul Bley album), 1989
 The Nearness of You (Red Garland album), 1962
 The Nearness of You (Helen Merrill album), 1958
 The Nearness of You (Houston Person album), 1977
 The Nearness of You (Frank Sinatra album), 1967